William Trevorian Stuart Best (born 21 February 1985) is an English television presenter. He has presented numerous shows for Channel 4, ITV and the BBC including T4 on the Beach and Dance Dance Dance. He has also written articles for the HuffPost.

Career
Best's first presenting role came in 2010 when he co-presented the comedy music chat show Suck My Pop on Viva with Girls Aloud singer Kimberley Walsh.

From 2011 to 2012, Best was one of the presenters on T4. The same year, he presented the 4Music music show The Crush, taking over from Rick Edwards and presented dating show Love Shaft on E4. He also presented Got to Dance: Auditions Uncut, a spin-off of the dancing competition Got to Dance and The Gleekly.

In 2012 and 2013, best presented the iTunes Festival for Channel 4 and E4 along with Nick Grimshaw, Annie Mac, Lauren Laverne and Tom Ravenscroft.

In 2015, Best presented the BBC Three documentary Is This Rape? Sex on Trial which tested a group of British teenagers to see if they can work out if a specially written drama about a sexual encounter is consensual sex or if a crime has been committed.

In 2017, Best co-presented the ITV talent Dance Dance Dance alongside Alesha Dixon. The show was axed after one series.

In 2022, Best will appear on Celebrity Coach Trip alongside friend and comedian Matt Richardson.

Filmography

References

External links
 

1985 births
British television presenters
Living people
People from London